The 2005–06 Phoenix Suns season was the 38th season of the franchise in the National Basketball Association (NBA). The Suns were led by head coach Mike D'Antoni, posting a 54–28 record, third best in the Western Conference. All home games were played at the former America West Arena, which changed its name to US Airways Center in January 2006.

The Suns looked to improve on their league-best 62–20 record and a trip to the Western Conference Finals in the 2004–05 season. The Suns suffered a major setback before the season, when All-Star Amar'e Stoudemire underwent microfracture surgery on his left knee. Stoudemire returned for three games, before undergoing another surgery on his right knee. The team was led by defending MVP Steve Nash and All-Star Shawn Marion. Marion led the team in points (21.8), rebounds (11.8), steals (2.0) and blocks (1.7) per game. Nash led the league in assists with 10.5 a game, while posting a career- high 18.8 points a game, earning his second consecutive MVP award.

With injuries to Stoudemire and backup forward-center Kurt Thomas, the Suns looked to second-year forward Boris Diaw to fill in the middle. Listed in the Suns' media guide as a guard before the season, the 6-foot 8-inch Diaw started at small forward, power forward and center throughout the season, posting 13 points, 7 rebounds, 6 assists and a block a game, earning Most Improved Player honors.

In the first round of the playoffs, the Suns fell into a 1–3 hole against their longtime rivals, the Los Angeles Lakers. They became (at that time) the eighth team in NBA history to recover from a 3–1 deficit, winning the final three games of the series to advance to the semifinals. In the semifinals, they defeated the Lakers' Staples Center co-tenants, the Los Angeles Clippers, in another seven-game series. The Suns fell in the Conference Finals to the Dallas Mavericks in six games.

Offseason

NBA Draft

Roster

Regular season

Standings

Record vs. opponents

Playoffs

Game log

|- align="center" bgcolor="#ccffcc"
| 1
| April 23
| L.A. Lakers
| W 107–102
| Tim Thomas (22)
| Tim Thomas (15)
| Steve Nash (10)
| US Airways Center18,422
| 1–0
|- align="center" bgcolor="#ffcccc"
| 2
| April 26
| L.A. Lakers
| L 93–99
| Steve Nash (29)
| Marion, Thomas (9)
| Steve Nash (9)
| US Airways Center18,422
| 1–1
|- align="center" bgcolor="#ffcccc"
| 3
| April 28
| @ L.A. Lakers
| L 92–99
| Shawn Marion (20)
| Marion, Nash (7)
| Steve Nash (11)
| Staples Center18,997
| 1–2
|- align="center" bgcolor="#ffcccc"
| 4
| April 30
| @ L.A. Lakers
| L 98–99 (OT)
| Steve Nash (22)
| Shawn Marion (12)
| Steve Nash (11)
| Staples Center18,997
| 1–3
|- align="center" bgcolor="#ccffcc"
| 5
| May 2
| L.A. Lakers
| W 114–97
| Boris Diaw (25)
| Boris Diaw (10)
| Boris Diaw (9)
| US Airways Center18,422
| 2–3
|- align="center" bgcolor="#ccffcc"
| 6
| May 4
| @ L.A. Lakers
| W 126–118 (OT)
| Steve Nash (32)
| Shawn Marion (12)
| Steve Nash (13)
| Staples Center18,997
| 3–3
|- align="center" bgcolor="#ccffcc"
| 7
| May 6
| L.A. Lakers
| W 121–90
| Leandro Barbosa (26)
| Shawn Marion (10)
| Diaw, Nash (9)
| US Airways Center18,422
| 4–3

|- align="center" bgcolor="#ccffcc"
| 1
| May 8
| L.A. Clippers
| W 130–123
| Steve Nash (31)
| Shawn Marion (15)
| Steve Nash (12)
| US Airways Center18,422
| 1–0
|- align="center" bgcolor="#ffcccc"
| 2
| May 10
| L.A. Clippers
| L 97–122
| Raja Bell (20)
| Shawn Marion (6)
| Steve Nash (8)
| US Airways Center18,422
| 1–1
|- align="center" bgcolor="#ccffcc"
| 3
| May 12
| @ L.A. Clippers
| W 94–91
| Shawn Marion (32)
| Shawn Marion (19)
| Steve Nash (10)
| Staples Center19,877
| 2–1
|- align="center" bgcolor="#ffcccc"
| 4
| May 14
| @ L.A. Clippers
| L 107–114
| Raja Bell (33)
| Shawn Marion (10)
| Steve Nash (11)
| Staples Center19,897
| 2–2
|- align="center" bgcolor="#ccffcc"
| 5
| May 16
| L.A. Clippers
| W 125–118 (2OT)
| Shawn Marion (36)
| Shawn Marion (20)
| Steve Nash (13)
| US Airways Center18,422
| 3–2
|- align="center" bgcolor="#ffcccc"
| 6
| May 18
| @ L.A. Clippers
| L 106–118
| Shawn Marion (34)
| Diaw, Marion (9)
| Steve Nash (11)
| Staples Center19,985
| 3–3
|- align="center" bgcolor="#ccffcc"
| 7
| May 22
| L.A. Clippers
| W 127–107
| Shawn Marion (30)
| Shawn Marion (9)
| Steve Nash (11)
| US Airways Center18,422
| 4–3

|- align="center" bgcolor="#ccffcc"
| 1
| May 24
| @ Dallas
| W 121–118
| Boris Diaw (34)
| Shawn Marion (13)
| Steve Nash (16)
| American Airlines Center20,789
| 1–0
|- align="center" bgcolor="#ffcccc"
| 2
| May 26
| @ Dallas
| L 98–105
| Boris Diaw (25)
| Shawn Marion (19)
| Steve Nash (11)
| American Airlines Center20,934
| 1–1
|- align="center" bgcolor="#ffcccc"
| 3
| May 28
| Dallas
| L 88–95
| Steve Nash (21)
| Shawn Marion (18)
| Steve Nash (7)
| US Airways Center18,422
| 1–2
|- align="center" bgcolor="#ccffcc"
| 4
| May 30
| Dallas
| W 106–86
| Leandro Barbosa (24)
| Boris Diaw (9)
| Steve Nash (7)
| US Airways Center18,422
| 2–2
|- align="center" bgcolor="#ffcccc"
| 5
| June 1
| @ Dallas
| L 101–117
| Tim Thomas (26)
| Shawn Marion (10)
| Steve Nash (11)
| American Airlines Center20,977
| 2–3
|- align="center" bgcolor="#ffcccc"
| 6
| June 3
| Dallas
| L 93–102
| Boris Diaw (30)
| Diaw, Marion (11)
| Steve Nash (9)
| US Airways Center18,422
| 2–4
|-

Awards and honors

Week/Month
 Shawn Marion was named Western Conference Player of the Month for February.
 Steve Nash was named Western Conference Player of the Week for games played November 21 through November 27.
 Shawn Marion was named Western Conference Player of the Week for games played December 26 through January 1.
 Steve Nash was named Western Conference Player of the Week for games played January 2 through January 8.

All-Star
 Steve Nash was voted as a starter for the Western Conference in the All-Star Game. It was his fourth All-Star selection. Nash finished second in voting among Western Conference guards with 1,818,230 votes.
 Shawn Marion was selected as a reserve for the Western Conference in the All-Star Game. It was his third All-Star selection. Marion finished ninth in voting among Western Conference forwards with 285,505 votes.
 Raja Bell was selected to compete in the Three-Point Shootout. Bell did not participate due to personal issues and was replaced by Gilbert Arenas.
 Steve Nash was selected to compete in the Skills Challenge. Nash lost the competition to Dwyane Wade.
 Team Phoenix, consisting of Shawn Marion, Kelly Miller and Dan Majerle, competed in the Shooting Stars Competition, losing to Team San Antonio.

Season
 Steve Nash received the Most Valuable Player Award.
 Boris Diaw received the Most Improved Player Award.
 Steve Nash was named to the All-NBA First Team.
 Shawn Marion was named to the All-NBA Third Team. Marion also finished seventh in Defensive Player of the Year voting.
 Steve Nash led the league in assists per game with a 10.5 average, and total assists with 826.
 Steve Nash led the league in free throw percentage, making 92.1% of his attempts.
 Raja Bell finished 13th in Defensive Player of the Year voting, and 23rd in Most Improved Player voting.
 Leandro Barbosa finished seventh in Sixth Man of the Year voting.
 Eddie House finished 13th in Sixth Man of the Year voting.

Player statistics

Season

|- align="center" bgcolor=""
|  || 57 || 11 || 27.9 || .481 || style="background:#FF8800;color:#423189;" | .444 || .755 || 2.6 || 2.8 || .8 || .1 || 13.1
|- align="center" bgcolor="#f0f0f0"
| * || 2 || 0 || 10.5 || .429 || .000 || 1.000^ || 1.5 || 1.0 || .0 || .0 || 4.5
|- align="center" bgcolor=""
|  || 79 || 79 || 37.5 || .457 || .442 || .788 || 3.2 || 2.6 || 1.0 || .3 || 14.7
|- align="center" bgcolor="#f0f0f0"
|  || 42 || 0 || 8.2 || .496 || .286 || .619 || 1.7 || 0.4 || .1 || .3 || 3.4
|- align="center" bgcolor=""
| * || 1 || 0 || 5.0 || .333 || .000 || .667 || 1.0 || 0.0 || 1.0 || .0 || 4.0
|- align="center" bgcolor="#f0f0f0"
|  || style="background:#FF8800;color:#423189;" | 81 || 70 || 35.5 || style="background:#FF8800;color:#423189;" | .526† || .267 || .731 || 6.9 || 6.2 || .7 || 1.0 || 13.3
|- align="center" bgcolor=""
|  || 3 || 0 || 4.3 || .667† || . || . || 1.0 || 0.0 || .0 || .3 || 1.3
|- align="center" bgcolor="#f0f0f0"
|  || 21 || 2 || 11.8 || .415 || . || .875 || 2.7 || 0.3 || .2 || .1 || 2.9
|- align="center" bgcolor=""
|  || style="background:#FF8800;color:#423189;" | 81 || 0 || 17.5 || .422 || .389 || .805 || 1.6 || 1.8 || .5 || .1 || 9.8
|- align="center" bgcolor="#f0f0f0"
| * || 27 || 1 || 15.6 || .295 || .222 || .692 || 2.4 || 1.1 || .4 || .2 || 3.7
|- align="center" bgcolor=""
|  || 75 || 24 || 23.6 || .418 || .386 || .851 || 3.4 || 0.8 || .5 || .7 || 9.3
|- align="center" bgcolor="#f0f0f0"
|  || style="background:#FF8800;color:#423189;" | 81 || style="background:#FF8800;color:#423189;" | 81 || style="background:#FF8800;color:#423189;" | 40.3 || .525 || .331 || .809 || style="background:#FF8800;color:#423189;" | 11.8 || 1.8 || style="background:#FF8800;color:#423189;" | 2.0 || style="background:#FF8800;color:#423189;" | 1.7 || style="background:#FF8800;color:#423189;" | 21.8
|- align="center" bgcolor=""
|  || 79 || 79 || 35.4 || .512 || .439 || style="background:#FF8800;color:#423189;" | .921^ || 4.2 || style="background:#FF8800;color:#423189;" | 10.5 || .8 || .2 || 18.8
|- align="center" bgcolor="#f0f0f0"
|  || 3 || 3 || 16.7 || .333 || .000 || .889 || 5.3 || 0.7 || .3 || 1.0 || 8.7
|- align="center" bgcolor=""
|  || 53 || 50 || 26.6 || .486 || . || .815 || 7.8 || 1.1 || .4 || 1.0 || 8.6
|- align="center" bgcolor="#f0f0f0"
| * || 26 || 10 || 24.4 || .435 || .429 || .667 || 4.9 || 0.7 || .6 || .2 || 11.0
|- align="center" bgcolor=""
|  || 10 || 0 || 4.3 || .440 || .364 || 1.000^ || 1.1 || 0.1 || .3 || .1 || 2.8
|- align="center" bgcolor="#f0f0f0"
| * || 12 || 0 || 7.2 || .364 || .333 || .667 || 1.7 || 0.3 || .1 || .2 || 2.8
|}

* – Stats with the Suns.
† – Minimum 300 field goals made.
^ – Minimum 125 free throws made.

Playoffs

|- align="center" bgcolor=""
|  || style="background:#FF8800;color:#423189;" | 20 || 3 || 31.6 || .470 || .391 || .862 || 1.6 || 2.7 || .8 || .2 || 14.2
|- align="center" bgcolor="#f0f0f0"
|  || 17 || 17 || 39.6 || .479 || style="background:#FF8800;color:#423189;" | .465^ || .829 || 2.8 || 2.2 || .6 || .2 || 13.6
|- align="center" bgcolor=""
|  || 3 || 0 || 2.3 || .500 || .500^ || .000 || 1.0 || 0.0 || .0 || .3 || 1.7
|- align="center" bgcolor="#f0f0f0"
|  || style="background:#FF8800;color:#423189;" | 20 || style="background:#FF8800;color:#423189;" | 20 || 39.8 || style="background:#FF8800;color:#423189;" | .526 || .429 || .761 || 6.7 || 5.2 || .9 || 1.1 || 18.7
|- align="center" bgcolor=""
|  || 5 || 0 || 2.4 || .333 || . || .000 || 0.4 || 0.0 || .0 || .0 || 0.4
|- align="center" bgcolor="#f0f0f0"
|  || 14 || 0 || 9.3 || .365 || .214 || .750 || 0.6 || 0.4 || .1 || .1 || 3.1
|- align="center" bgcolor=""
|  || style="background:#FF8800;color:#423189;" | 20 || 6 || 17.7 || .341 || .308 || .846 || 3.6 || 0.3 || .3 || .9 || 4.3
|- align="center" bgcolor="#f0f0f0"
|  || style="background:#FF8800;color:#423189;" | 20 || style="background:#FF8800;color:#423189;" | 20 || style="background:#FF8800;color:#423189;" | 42.5 || .489 || .314 || .881 || style="background:#FF8800;color:#423189;" | 11.7 || 1.6 || style="background:#FF8800;color:#423189;" | 1.9 || style="background:#FF8800;color:#423189;" | 1.2 || style="background:#FF8800;color:#423189;" | 20.4
|- align="center" bgcolor=""
|  || style="background:#FF8800;color:#423189;" | 20 || style="background:#FF8800;color:#423189;" | 20 || 39.9 || .502 || .368 || style="background:#FF8800;color:#423189;" | .912 || 3.7 || style="background:#FF8800;color:#423189;" | 10.2 || .4 || .3 || style="background:#FF8800;color:#423189;" | 20.4
|- align="center" bgcolor="#f0f0f0"
|  || 1 || 0 || 6.0 || . || . || .500 || 1.0 || 0.0 || .0 || .0 || 1.0
|- align="center" bgcolor=""
|  || style="background:#FF8800;color:#423189;" | 20 || 14 || 31.8 || .491 || .444 || .776 || 6.3 || 1.3 || .9 || .4 || 15.1
|- align="center" bgcolor="#f0f0f0"
|  || 4 || 0 || 2.0 || .000 || .000 || .500 || 0.3 || 0.5 || .0 || .0 || 0.3
|}

^ – Minimum 5 three-pointers made.

References

Phoenix Suns seasons